Rosevears may refer to:

 Rosevears, Tasmania, a town in northern Tasmania, Australia
 The electoral division of Rosevears, an electoral division for the Tasmanian Legislative Council

See also
 Rosevear, Isles of Scilly, an uninhabited island in England
 Rosevear, Cornwall, a hamlet in Cornwall, England